Masoyein Monastery, also known as Masoeyein Monastery, is a Buddhist monastery in Mandalay, Myanmar.

References 

Buddhist monasteries
Monasteries in Myanmar